Alexander Hugh Tobin  (born 3 November 1965) is an Australian former professional soccer player who played as a centre-back. He is the fifth-most capped player for the Australia national team with 87 'A' appearances, including 30 as captain. He made his international debut on 9 March 1988 in an Olympic qualifying match against Taiwan (3–2) in Adelaide.

Club career
Tobin spent his entire club career playing in Australia. He played most of his club career as a defender with Adelaide City in the National Soccer League. Alex left Adelaide City in 2000, after sixteen years with the club, to join Parramatta Power. He finished his career with Northern Spirit. Tobin played a total of 522 senior club games in Australia.

Tobin worked for the Central Coast Mariners as assistant first team coach.

Career statistics

Club

International

Scores and results list Australia's goal tally first, score column indicates score after each Tobin goal.

|}

The Alex Tobin Medal
In 2008, the PFA Alex Tobin OAM Medal was inaugurated by the Professional Footballers Australia (PFA). It is to be awarded annually by the PFA to a current, or a former, player based on four attributes demonstrated by Alex Tobin throughout his career and which reflect the philosophy of the PFA: Leadership, achievement as a player, commitment to ones fellow professionals and service and dedication to the game. The first two medals were conferred on Joe Marston and, posthumously, Johnny Warren.

Honours
Adelaide City:
 NSL Championship: 1986, 1991–92, 1993–94
 NSL Cup: 1989, 1991–92
 Oceania Club Championship: 1987

Australia
 OFC Nations Cup: 1996

Individual
 FFA Hall of Champions Inductee – 2007
 Joe Marston Medal: 1991–92, 1993–94 with Adelaide City

References

External links
 Central Coast Mariners profile 
 FFA – Hall of Fame profile
 Oz Football profile
 
 
 

1965 births
Living people
Soccer players from Adelaide
Australian soccer players
Association football defenders
Adelaide City FC players
Parramatta Power players
Northern Spirit FC players
National Soccer League (Australia) players
Australia international soccer players
Olympic soccer players of Australia
Footballers at the 1988 Summer Olympics
1996 OFC Nations Cup players
1997 FIFA Confederations Cup players
1998 OFC Nations Cup players
Australian soccer coaches
Central Coast Mariners FC non-playing staff